CFPL-FM, branded as FM96, is a Canadian radio station owned by Corus Entertainment and based in London, Ontario. It transmits at a power of 179,000 watts on the assigned frequency of 95.9 MHz. CFPL-FM plays an alternative-leaning active rock format. CFPL-FM's studios are located in downtown with other Corus London stations while its transmitter is located in Southwest London on the CFPL-DT tower that is also utilized by sister station CFHK-FM.

History
Canada's third-oldest FM station, originally signed on in 1948 at 93.5 MHz as a simulcast station of CFPL (AM). The FM station started airing separate programming in 1949, the same year it started broadcasting at 95.9 MHz at 4,440 watts. The "FPL" call sign letters stand for its original owner, The London Free Press newspaper.

In 1961, CFPL-FM boosted its signal strength to 179,000 watts. During the 1960s and early 1970s, CFPL-FM broadcast classical music as an affiliate of the CBC FM network. In 1972, the station disaffiliated from the CBC, and adopted a variety format under the name Stereo 96, which included various music formats and some talk programming. In 1979, the station became known as FM96 and the format changed to adult contemporary under the "Rock 'n' Easy" moniker. CFPL had the slogan "Music Above All" during part of the 1980s. CFPL shifted to rock in the 1980s.

In 2006, FM96 was named Station of The Year and won the BDS Cutting Edge Award.

References

External links
 FM96
 
 

Fpl
Fpl
Fpl
Radio stations established in 1948
1948 establishments in Ontario